Anaïs Bescond (born 15 May 1987) is a French biathlete, olympic champion and world champion. She is also a non-commissioned officer.

Career
Bescond was born in Aunay-sur-Odon. She moved to Morbier, in the Jura region, with her family and began skiing. She competed at the Biathlon World Championships 2011, and won a silver medal in the relay with the French team, a result repeated at the Biathlon World Championships 2012.

She won her first victory on the World Cup biathlon sprint at Antholz-Anterselva, played on 16 January 2014.

Bescond competed in the Sochi 2014 Winter Olympics for France. Her best performance was two 5th places in the individual and sprint.

At the Pyeongchang 2018 Winter Olympics, she finished at the 3rd place in the pursuit, claimed gold with the French Team in the mixed relay and took bronze in the relay.

She announced her retirement after the 2021/22 season.

Results

Olympic Games
3 medals (1 gold, 2 bronze)

World Championships
8 medals (1 gold, 6 silver, 1 bronze)

*The single mixed relay was added as an event in 2019.

World Cup
World Cup rankings

Individual victories
1 victory (1 Sp)

Relay victories

13 victories

References

External links

1987 births
Living people
French female biathletes
Sportspeople from Calvados (department)
Biathlon World Championships medalists
Biathletes at the 2014 Winter Olympics
Biathletes at the 2018 Winter Olympics
Biathletes at the 2022 Winter Olympics
Olympic biathletes of France
Medalists at the 2018 Winter Olympics
Olympic medalists in biathlon
Olympic gold medalists for France
Olympic bronze medalists for France
21st-century French women